Marina Sisoyeva (Uzbek: Марина Сисоева; born 30 May 1993 in Fergana, Uzbekistan) is an Uzbek weighlifter. She competed at the 2012 Summer Olympics in the Women's 48 kg.

References

1993 births
Living people
Olympic weightlifters of Uzbekistan
Weightlifters at the 2012 Summer Olympics
Weightlifters at the 2014 Asian Games
Uzbekistani female weightlifters
Asian Games competitors for Uzbekistan
21st-century Uzbekistani women